Naked Flame is the third album from the Ukrainian psychobilly band Mad Heads. It was released in Ukraine and in Germany.

Song "Полетаем" (Poletayem) written by A.Ukupnik (music) and Zaluzhnaya (lyrics).

Tracks from it, "Flew Away", "Tonight I'm Alone", "The Road" and "" По Барабану"(Po Barabany) appeared on  Ukraine-released compilation album Naykrascha Myt.

Track listing
" Naked Flame" - 2:43
" Stinky Town" - 3:05
" Tonight I'm Alone" - 2:59
" Electricity" - 3:28
" Flew Away" - 5:04
" Over My Dead Body" - 2:54
" The Wave 999" - 3:43
" Spring In The Bushes" - 3:22
" Frightened By The Darkness" - 4:04
" Sleeping" - 3:58
" Won't Get Tired" - 3:35
" Prukr Goes Surfin'" - 3:24
" Psycholella" - 3:33
" The Road" - 4:35
" Мовчання Козлів" (Movchannya Kozliv) - 1:00
" По Барабану" (Po Barabanu) - 3:27
" Полєтаєм" (Poletayem) - 4:09

Video
По Барабану (Po Barabanu) by Victor Priduvalov (Mental drive studio)
Полєтаєм (Poletayem) by Victor Priduvalov (Mental drive studio)

Personnel
Vadym Krasnooky – vocal, guitar
Maxym Krasnooky – backing vocals,doublebass
Bogdan Ocheretyany – backing vocals, drums

Guests appearances
Maxym Kochetov - saxophone (track 5)
Anton "Burito" Buryko - trumpet (tracks 12, 13)

2002 albums
Mad Heads albums